Kaanaakkinaavu is a 1996 Indian Malayalam film directed by Sibi Malayil based on a script by T. A. Razzaq. The film was produced by P. V. Gangadharan under the banner of Grihalakshmi Productions. The film stars Mukesh, Murali and Sukanya in the lead roles. The film has musical score by Raghu Kumar. The film premiered at the Indian Panorama section of the IFFI and was theatrically released on 14 April 1996. The film was a commercial success. The film won the Nargis Dutt Award for Best Feature Film on National Integration. The film also won the Kerala State Film Award for Second Best Film.

Cast
Mukesh as Hamsa
Murali as Chandradas
Sukanya

Soundtrack
The music was composed by Raghu Kumar and the lyrics were written by Gireesh Puthenchery.

Awards
Kerala State Film Award for Second Best Film - P. V. Gangadharan

References

External links
 

1996 films
1990s Malayalam-language films
Best Film on National Integration National Film Award winners
Films scored by Raghu Kumar